St Andrew the Apostle Greek Orthodox School is an inclusive secondary school which opened in 2013 in the Brunswick Park area of the London Borough of Barnet.

It is the first and only state-funded Greek Orthodox secondary school in Britain. The school is named after St Andrew the Apostle. It serves families form several different boroughs and the wider Greek Orthodox community. 

The Greek Orthodox element of the school is introduced to students through communal worship in assemblies and a chapel at the school. The school enrolls students from all backgrounds.

The school has been established jointly by Russell Education Trust, the Greek Orthodox Church and the Classical Education Trust.

The students completed their first GCSEs in 2018 and the school was placed in the top 5% across the country

History 
The school opened in September 2013 with its first cohort of Year 7 students with the founding headteacher, Robert Ahearn.

In October 2013, the school was visited by the First lady of Cyprus, Andri Anastasiades where she delivered a short speech.

In 2015, the school was reported to receive £18, 507 in state funding for each of its 73 pupils, compared to a national average of £4,767 per local authority pupil, making it the highest amount of funding per pupil in England.

In 2021, the school was visited by Archbishop Nikitas of Thyateira and Great Britain

Site 
St Andrew the Apostle School, opened in a former college, using local sports amenities such as Bethune Park. In 2018, an office block within the business park was converted into the second building for the school.  In 2020, the department of education agreed to build a new purposeful school building within the business park.

In 2022, the construction of a new school building commenced and is expected to be completed by September 2024.

References 

Secondary schools in the London Borough of Barnet
Free schools in London
Free Schools in England with a Formal Faith Designation
Greek Orthodoxy in the United Kingdom
Educational institutions established in 2013
2013 establishments in England